Club de Baloncesto Islas Canarias, better known for sponsorship reasons as SPAR Gran Canaria, is a Spanish women's basketball team from Las Palmas de Gran Canaria. Founded in 1980, it has played in the Spanish Women's League since 1983.

1998-99 was Islas Canarias' most successful season to date with the club winning the Ronchetti Cup, the national Cup and being the national championship's runner-up. The following year the team won its second cup and again reached the Ronchetti Cup's final, and in 2003 it played its third European final, in the new EuroCup.

The team declined in subsequent seasons, with two 6th spots as its best domestic results. Nonetheless, it has remained a regular in the EuroCup.

Season by season

Notable former players
 Astou Ndour 
 Rosi Sánchez
 Tiina Sten
 Iva Perovanović

Trophies
Spanish Cups: (2)
1999, 2000
Ronchetti Cup: (1)
1998–99

References

Liga Femenina de Baloncesto teams
Women's basketball teams in Spain
Basketball teams established in 1980
Sport in Las Palmas
Basketball teams in the Canary Islands